Richard K. Ashley is a postmodernist scholar of International relations. He is an associate professor at the Arizona State University's School of Politics and Global Studies.

Ashley studied at the University of California, Santa Barbara and at Massachusetts Institute of Technology (MIT). He was research assistant to Hayward Alker. Initially, Ashley's research was on the balance of power in international relations, particularly in his The Political Economy of War and Peace (1980). He soon began to shift his approach to metatheoretical questions and Critical Theory. By the mid-1980s, Ashley had adopted a postmodernist and subversive approach to international relations theory, exemplified by his influences: Jacques Derrida, Michel Foucault, and Gayatri Chakravorty Spivak.

Ashley was one of the first to challenge the position of mainstream realism and liberalism. In "The Poverty of Neorealism" (1984), he coined the term "neorealism" to describe the work of Kenneth Waltz.

Early life
Ashley received his Bachelor of Arts degree from University of California, Santa Barbara in 1970, after which he entered graduate school in Massachusetts Institute of Technology (MIT) studying political science. He received his Doctorate of Philosophy from MIT in 1977, with a dissertation titled Growth, Rivalry, and Balance: The Sino-Soviet-American Triangle of Conflict (1976), supervised by Nazli Choucri.

Career

Ashley studied under Hayward Alker and served as his research assistant. This relationship influenced Ashley's approach to international relations. Other influences include Jacques Derrida, Gayatri Chakravorty Spivak, Foucauldian discourse analysis, and Jürgen Habermas. For some time in the 1970s, Ashley was assistant professor of international relations at the University of Southern California.

Early in his career, with The Political Economy of War and Peace (1980), Ashley focused on conventional analysis of balance of power. He soon began to focus on metatheoretical issues instead. Before turning to postmodernist international relations, Ashley's early work moved to the direction of Critical Theory. He became the first scholar to introduce the thought of Habermas to international relations. All Ashley's major writings from this phase of the first half of the 1980s can be characterized as a critique of technical rationality in the study of international relations and advocacy of emancipatory ways of knowing. This approach is evident in his debates concerning Habermas with John H. Herz. Since the mid-1980s, his critique has become a self-confessed subversive dissidence of the discipline. Ashley has since distanced himself from his early work, considering it too ideological in its epistemology.

Ashley become one of the first to challenge the predominance of mainstream realism and liberalism in the 1980s.

Ashley retired in 2018. Prior he taught at Arizona State University's Department of Political Science (now School of Politics and Global Studies) since 1981, as an associate professor.

Some of Ashley's influential work includes "The Poverty of Neorealism" (1984) where he coined the term "neorealism" to describe the work of Kenneth Waltz and others. Indeed, Ashley's critique of microeconomic analogies employed by neorealists made him a key figure in the inter-paradigm debate in international relations theory. "Untying the Sovereign State: A Double Reading of the Anarchy Problematique" (1988) is a Derridan double reading of the concept of international anarchy in traditional international relations literature. "Living on Border Lines: Man, Poststructuralism, and War" (1989) is influential, too. In 1989, he contributed to the seminal volume International/Intertextual Relations edited by fellow postmodernists James Der Derian and Michael J. Shapiro. In addition, Ashley has contributed many academic articles to journals such as International Organization, Millennium, Alternatives, and International Studies Quarterly. Ashley is an editor of International Studies Quarterly.

According to Darryl S. L. Jarvis, "the undiminished allure of postmodernism  is plainly attributable to ... Richard Ashley, and to a lesser extent,  Walker", with whom Ashley has also written.

He received the Karl Deutsch Award of the International Studies Association in 1985.

Works

With R. B. J. Walker

See also

Genealogy (philosophy)
Theory of International Politics
Man, the State, and War
Reflectivism
Postpositivism (international relations)
Lene Hansen
Instrumental and value rationality
Anti-foundationalism
Relativism
Deconstruction
Constructivism (international relations)
Postmodernism in political science

References

Works cited

Further reading

External links
 at Arizona State University

Living people
Place of birth missing (living people)
Year of birth missing (living people)
University of California, Santa Barbara alumni
MIT School of Humanities, Arts, and Social Sciences alumni
Arizona State University faculty
American political scientists
 American international relations scholars
Postmodern writers